Felicia erigeroides, commonly known as wild Michaelmas daisy, isithelelo or ixhaphozi, is a species of flowering plant in the family Asteraceae native to South Africa, where it is found from Humansdorp to KwaZulu-Natal.

Felicia erigeroides was first described in 1836 by Augustin Pyramus de Candolle. Harvey reclassified it as Aster erigoides, but this was an illegitimate name.

References 

erigeroides
Flora of South Africa
Plants described in 1836